is a Japanese Yakuza from Fukuoka Prefecture. He is the fifth president of the yakuza group Kudo-kai.

Early life
Nomura was born in 1946 as the sixth and youngest child in a rich peasant family. As a teenager, he was addicted to gambling and dedicated his fortunes to this habit and became a delinquent. He was often sent into a juvenile home for various crimes, including stealing a car. Nomura did not graduate from secondary school. It was only in his 20s when he joined Kudo-kai, a Yakuza gang.

During his years in the underworld, Nomura was involved in crimes such as real estate fraud and illegal gambling dens, which earned him huge revenues. He also rose through the ranks to later become a Yakuza leader. At the peak of his criminal career in 2008, he had over 1,200 members under his wing, although by 2020 that number had fallen to around 400.

In 1998, Nomura publicly shot a leader of a fishery business. In 2012, a retired police officer who had been probing Kudo-kai was shot in the leg on Nomura's orders, while in 2013, a nurse at a cosmetic surgery clinic was stabbed after Nomura was displeased by her attitude and the outcome of his operation.

Arrests
On September 13, 2014, Nomura was arrested by Riot Police for his involvement in the shooting and murder of Kunihiro Kajiwara, a former fishermen's union leader in Kitakyushu. On October 1, he was re-arrested for the stabbing and attempted murder of a nurse. On May 22, 2015, he was re-arrested for the stabbing and attempted murder of a dentist. On June 16, he was re-arrested on suspicion of tax evasion. On July 6, he was re-arrested for the attempted murder and shooting of a former police inspector.

Trial and conviction
Nomura's trial opened January 14, 2021. On August 24, 2021, the Fukuoka District Court sentenced Nomura to death for ordering four assaults, including murder. 

Nomura was the first senior member of the Yakuza to be sentenced to death. His right hand man Fumio Tanoue was sentenced to life imprisonment in the same trial. Nomura reportedly threatened presiding judge Tsutomu Adachi, stating that he would regret sending him to the gallows, which led to tightened security around the judge and all those involved in the court proceedings. He is currently appealing against the sentence.

References 

1946 births
Living people
Yakuza members
Japanese crime bosses
People from Fukuoka Prefecture
Japanese people convicted of murder
Japanese prisoners sentenced to death
Prisoners sentenced to death by Japan
Prisoners and detainees of Japan
Japanese prisoners sentenced to death